Big Easy Roller Derby (est. 2005) is a women's, flat-track roller derby league in New Orleans, Louisiana. Big Easy is a founding member league of the Women's Flat Track Derby Association (WFTDA).

History
Big Easy Roller Derby was founded as Big Easy Rollergirls in the spring of 2005, and had planned their first bout during Mardi Gras 2006. Unfortunately, the league was disrupted by and had to regroup following the events surrounding Hurricane Katrina, beginning competitive play on September 16, 2006. After a citywide tryout, BERD had two teams and more than 30 active members its first season. The debut bout was won by the Hor-Nots (v the 'Aints) 128–123 in overtime before a sellout crowd.

In their second season, Big Easy Roller Derby doubled their membership with new recruits and was able to field four local teams: Confederacy of Punches, Crescent Wenches, Marigny Antoinettes and StoryVillains, as well as a travel team, the Big Easy Roller Derby Allstars.  By the fourth season, Big Easy Roller Derby switched to a two-team structure: The Big Easy Allstars (A team) and the Crescent Wenches (B team). The Marigny Antoinettes are now the incoming year's "Fresh Meat" and the StoryVillains are the recreational team composed of retired Big Easy Roller Derby skaters.

The Big Easy Roller Derby organization has continued to grow and evolve, maintaining a rigorous athletic training regimen (both on skates and off) while regularly contributing to community-service–oriented efforts around New Orleans.  Charities and organizations BERD has worked with include the Slaughter, Louisiana Volunteer Fire Department, Arabi Wrecking Krewe, New Orleans City Park, Sydney and Walda Besthoff Sculpture Garden, NO AIDS Task Force, Common Ground Collective, KaBOOM!, KIDsmART and the Louisiana SPCA.

Big Easy Roller Derby are a diverse group of female athletes, ranging in age from the twenty-one to over fifty. By day, they are dental hygienists, community college students, teachers, lawyers, stay-at-home-mothers, and waitresses.

For their first two seasons, home bouts were held at Blaine Kern's Mardi Gras World in Algiers, New Orleans. The league currently holds their home bouts before large crowds (400 - 600 attendees) at the University of New Orleans Human Performance Center.

Voted “Best Local Sports Team" by local magazine Where Y’at in their first season, the league's mission continues to be to encourage and empower women through the sport of flat-track roller derby. In doing so they provide alternative athletic entertainment while supporting charitable organizations that benefit the community at large.

In 2011, BERD converted from an LLC to a non-profit corporation, but does not have 501(c)(3) status. The league changed their name from Big Easy Rollergirls to Big Easy Roller Derby in 2019.

BERD has a partnership with Crescent City Crushers, the local junior roller derby league, to promote the sport locally.

WFTDA competition

In October 2011, Big Easy were ranked number one by the Derby South organization, which represents leagues from five southern states.

After the 2013 season, they were ranked 93 in the world by the WFTDA. In 2014, Big Easy made their first appearance at WFTDA Division 2 Playoffs, coming into the Duluth tournament as the third seed, and ultimately finishing in fourth place.

Rankings

References

Bibliography
 April 2008 - W Magazine - Bruce Weber spread on New Orleans features the Big Easy Rollergirls
 November 2007 - NOLA.com launches Flat Track Fever
 March 2007 - USA Rollersports Magazine "Frivolity in a Forgotten City"
 March 2007 - New Orleans Magazine "Easy Rollin'"
 Feb. 2007 - Times Picayune "Back to Basics"
 Dec. 2006 - Health & Fitness "Rolling Thunder"
 Nov. 2006 - UNO Driftwood "Roller Derby Action"
 Nov. 2006 - NolaFugees.com "Warriors of the Flat Rink"
 Oct. 2006 - Times Picayune "Rocking and Rolling"
 Oct. 2006 - Times Picayune "Rollergirls Make Algiers Their Rink"
 Oct. 2006 - The Gambit "A Sport for the Well-Wheeled"
 Sept. 2006 - The Gambit "Hot Picks"
 Sept. 2006 - New Orleans Magazine "People to Watch"
 Sept. 2006 - Tulane New Wave "Big Easy Rollergirls Ready for Prime Time"
 July 2006 - WTUL Community Gumbo "Through Hell and High Water""
 June 2006 - Where Y'at Magazine "Big Easy Rollergirls named 'Best local sports team'"

Further reading
 March 2006 - CNN with Anderson Cooper
 July 2007 - Times Picayune, "Big Easy Rollergirls to  famed bull run" 
 July 2008 - International Herald Tribune, "Roller girls give chase in La. version of bull run"

External links
 Big Easy Rollergirls web site
 Big Easy Rollergirls Myspace page
 Official website for San Fermin in Nueva Orleans
 Women's Flat Track Derby Association web site

Roller derby leagues established in 2005
Roller derby leagues in Louisiana
Sports teams in New Orleans
Women's sports in the United States
2005 establishments in Louisiana